The Australian Performing Arts Grammar School (abbreviated as APGS) is an independent co-educational specialist secondary day school that specialises in creative and performing arts, located in Broadway, an inner-city suburb of Sydney, New South Wales, Australia.

History
The school, formerly known as the "Australian International Performing Arts High School" (AIPAH), was established in January 2005 with a total of 27 students for the purpose of providing a high quality, arts rich education to talented students of the wider community. In 2012 the school moved to a purpose built facility in Broadway, Glebe in order to reach a wider demographic of students. Along with the new location, the school was renamed to the "Australian Performing Arts Grammar School" (APGS) to emphasise the renewed shift towards performing arts and academic excellence.

Performances
APGS has performed at many high profile corporate, community and school events including:
 Showcase Performances at the Sydney Opera House, Seymour Centre, Enmore Theatre and Bangarra Dance Theatre
 The Lord Mayor's Christmas Party at The Rosehill Gardens
 Parramatta Business Awards for the Chamber of Commerce (2006, 2007, 2008, 2009, 2010)
 Performed for Oscar winner Dion Beebe at Parramatta Riverside
 Performed for Acclaimed Director Kimble Rendall
 International Disabilities day (2007, 2011)
 Fast & Fresh Junior Playwrights Competition
 Sydney Festival, Glebe Street Fair

See also

 List of non-government schools in New South Wales
 List of creative and performing arts high schools in New South Wales

References

External links

2005 establishments in Australia
Educational institutions established in 2005
Private secondary schools in Sydney
Glebe, New South Wales
Creative and performing arts high schools in New South Wales
Grammar schools in Australia